Çakırca can refer to the following villages in Turkey:

 Çakırca, Dursunbey
 Çakırca, Manyas